Wulfram Gerstner (born 1963 in Heilbronn) is a German and Swiss computational neuroscientist. His research focuses on neural spiking patterns in neural networks, and their connection to learning, spatial representation and navigation. Since 2006 Gerstner has been a full professor of Computer Science and Life Sciences at École Polytechnique Fédérale de Lausanne (EPFL), where he also serves as a Director of the Laboratory of Computational Neuroscience.

Career 

Gerstner studied physics at the University of Tübingen and at the Ludwig Maximilian University of Munich. In 1989, he received his Master's degree with a thesis in experimental quantum optics. He then joined the theoretical biophysics group of William Bialek at University of California, Berkeley as a visiting researcher. He received  his PhD in theoretical physics from the Technical University of Munich in 1993 under supervision from Leo van Hemmen. He did post doctoral work at Brandeis University and at Technical University of Munich, where he worked in theoretical neuroscience.

In 1996, he was nominated as assistant professor and in February 2001 he was promoted as an associate professor with tenure at EPFL. In August 2006, Gerstner was appointed full professor at EPFL in both the School of Computer and Communication Sciences and the School of Life Sciences.

Research 
Gerstner's research is focused on models of spiking neurons, spike-timing-dependent plasticity (STDP), neuronal coding in single neurons and neuron populations. He also investigates models of the hippocampus and their application in the spatial representation for navigation of rat-like autonomous agents.

He is also one of the initiators  of The Deep Artificial Composer (DAC), a deep-learning algorithm that can generate melodies by imitating a given style of music.

Books 
Gerstner is the author of neuroscientific text books such as Spiking Neuron Models: Single neurons, populations, plasticity  (Gerstner, W. and Kistler, W.M., 2002, Cambridge University Press) that introduced the field of spiking neural networks, and Neuronal dynamics: From single neurons to networks and models of cognition (Gerstner, W., Kistler, W.M., Naud, R. and Paninski, L., 2014, Cambridge University Press) on the field of computational neuroscience that was also published as an online version including exercises and video lectures.

Selected publications

Distinctions 
Gerstner has been an editorial board member of journals such as  Science,  The Journal of Neuroscience,  Network: Computation in Neural Systems, Journal of Computational Neuroscience, and Neural Computation.

He is the recipient of the Valentino Braitenberg Award for Computational Neuroscience 2018 and in 2010 he was awarded an ERC Advanced Grant by the European Research Council. Gerstner is an elected member of the Academy of Sciences and Literature Mainz.

References

External links 
 
 Web site of Laboratory of Computational Neuroscience
Online version of the textbook Neuronal dynamics: From single neurons to networks and models of cognition

German neuroscientists
Swiss neuroscientists
Living people
Ludwig Maximilian University of Munich alumni
University of Tübingen alumni
Academic staff of the École Polytechnique Fédérale de Lausanne
Computational neuroscience
Neural networks
1963 births
University of California, Berkeley alumni
Brandeis University alumni